Dugaldia is a genus of Mesoamerican flowering plants in the sunflower family.

Some authors treat this group as part of the larger genus, Hymenoxys.

 Species
 Dugaldia integrifolia (Kunth) Cass. - central + southern Mexico, Guatemala
 Dugaldia pinetorum (Standl.) Bierner - northern Mexico (Nuevo León)

References

Asteraceae genera
Helenieae
Flora of North America